Arab nationalism is a nationalist ideology that asserts the Arabs are a nation and promotes the unity of Arab people, celebrating the glories of Arab civilization, the language and literature of the Arabs, and calling for rejuvenation and political union in the Arab world. Its central premise is that the people of the Arab world, from the Atlantic Ocean to the Indian Ocean, constitute one nation bound together by common ethnicity, language, culture, history, identity, geography and politics. One of the primary goals of Arab nationalism is the end of Western influence in the Arab world, seen as a "nemesis" of Arab strength, and the removal of those Arab governments considered to be dependent upon Western power. It rose to prominence with the weakening and defeat of the Ottoman Empire in the early 20th century and declined after the defeat of the Arab armies in the Six-Day War.

Personalities and groups associated with Arab nationalism include King Faisal I of Iraq, Egyptian President Gamal Abdel Nasser, the Arab Nationalist Movement, Libyan leader Muammar Gaddafi, the Palestine Liberation Organization, the Arab Socialist Ba'ath Party which came to power in Iraq for some years and is still the ruling party in Syria, and its founder Michel Aflaq. Pan-Arabism is a related concept, in as much as it calls for supranational communalism among the Arab states.

Ideology

Arab nationalists believe that the Arab nation existed as a historical entity prior to the rise of nationalism in the 19th–20th century. The Arab nation was formed through the gradual establishment of Arabic as the language of communication and with the advent of Islam as a religion and culture in the region. Both Arabic and Islam served as the pillars of the nation. According to writer Youssef M. Choueiri, Arab nationalism represents the "Arabs' consciousness of their specific characteristics as well as their endeavor to build a modern state capable of representing the common will of the nation and all its constituent parts."

Within the Arab nationalist movement are three main ideas: that of the Arab nation; Arab nationalism; and pan-Arab unity. The 1936–1939 Arab revolt in Palestine led to the foundation of the Arab nationalist Ba'ath Party, which asserts that the Arab nation is the group of people who speak Arabic, inhabit the Arab world, and who feel they belong to the same nation. Arab nationalism is the "sum total" of the characteristics and qualities exclusive to the Arab nation, whereas pan-Arab unity is the modern idea that stipulates that the separate Arab countries must unify to form a single state under one political system.

Local patriotism centered on individual Arab countries was incorporated into the framework of Arab nationalism starting in the 1920s. This was done by positioning the Arabian Peninsula as the homeland of the Semitic peoples (the Canaanites and Arameans of the Levant and the Assyrians and Babylonians of Mesopotamia) who migrated throughout the Near East in ancient times or by associating the other pre-Islamic cultures, such as those of Egypt and North Africa and Horn of Africa, into an evolving Arab identity.

The modern Arabic language actually has two distinct words which can be translated into English as "nationalism": qawmiyya قومية, derived from the word qawm (meaning "tribe, ethnic nationality"), and wataniyya وطنية, derived from the word watan (meaning "homeland, native country"). The term qawmiyya means attachment to the Arab nation, while wataniyya means loyalty to a single Arab state. Wataniyya is sometimes disparaged as "regionalism" by those who consider pan-Arabism the only legitimate variant of Arab nationalism.

In the post-World War years, the concept of qawmiyya "gradually assumed a leftist coloration, calling for ... the creation of revolutionary Arab unity." Groups who subscribed to this point of view advocated opposition, violent and non-violent, against Israel and against Arabs who did not subscribe to this point of view. The person most identified with qawmiyya was Gamal Abdel Nasser of Egypt, who used both military and political power to spread his version of pan-Arab ideology throughout the Arab world. While qawmiyya still remains a potent political force today, the death of Nasser and the Arab defeat in the Six-Day War has weakened faith in this ideal. The current dominant ideology among Arab policy makers has shifted to wataniyya.

History

Origins

Throughout the late 19th century, beginning in the 1860s, a sense of loyalty to the "Fatherland" developed in intellectual circles based in the Levant and Egypt, but not necessarily an "Arab Fatherland". It developed from observance of the technological successes of Western Europe which they attributed to the prevailing of patriotism in those countries. During this period, a heavy influx of Christian missionaries and educators from Western countries provided what was termed the "Arab political revival", resulting in the establishment of secret societies within the empire.

In the 1860s, literature produced in the Mashriq (the Levant and Mesopotamia) which was under Ottoman control at the time, contained emotional intensity and strongly condemned the Ottoman Turks for "betraying Islam" and the Fatherland to the Christian West. In the view of Arab patriots, Islam had not always been in a "sorry state" and attributed the military triumphs and cultural glories of the Arabs to the advent of the religion, insisting that European modernism itself was of Islamic origin. The Ottomans, on the other hand, had deviated from true Islam and thus suffered decline. The reforming Ottoman and Egyptian governments were blamed for the situation because they attempted to borrow Western practices from the Europeans that were seen as unnatural and corrupt. The Arab patriots' view was that the Islamic governments should revive true Islam that would in turn, pave way for the establishment of constitutional representative government and freedom which, though Islamic in origin, was manifested in the West at the time.

Arabism and regional patriotism (such as in Egypt or in the Levant) mixed and gained predominance over Ottomanism among some Arabs in Syria and Lebanon. Ibrahim al-Yaziji, a Lebanese Christian philosopher, called for the Arabs to "recover their lost ancient vitality and throw off the yoke of the Turks" in 1868. A secret society promoting this goal was formed in the late 1870s, with al-Yazigi as a member. The group placed placards in Beirut calling for a rebellion against the Ottomans. Meanwhile, other Lebanese and Damascus-based notables, mostly Muslims, formed similar secret movements, although they differed as Christian groups who disfavoured Arabism called for a completely independent Lebanon while the Muslim Arab societies generally promoted an autonomous Greater Syria still under Ottoman rule.

As early as 1870, Syrian Christian writer Francis Marrash distinguished the notion of fatherland from that of nation; when applying the latter to Greater Syria, he pointed to the role played by language, besides customs and belief in common interests, in defining national identity. This distinction between fatherland and nation was also made by Hasan al-Marsafi in 1881. By the beginning of the 20th century, groups of Muslim Arabs embraced an Arab nationalist "self-view" that would provide as the basis of the Arab nationalist ideology of the 20th century. This new version of Arab patriotism was directly influenced by the Islamic modernism and revivalism of Muhammad Abduh, the Egyptian Muslim scholar. Abduh believed the Arabs' Muslim ancestors bestowed "rationality on mankind and created the essentials of modernity," borrowed by the West. Thus, while Europe advanced from adopting the modernist ideals of true Islam, the Muslims failed, corrupting and abandoning true Islam. Abduh influenced modern Arab nationalism in particular, because the revival of true Islam's ancestors (who were Arabs) would also become the revival of Arab culture and the restoration of the Arab position as the leaders of the Islamic world. One of Abduh's followers, Abd al-Rahman al-Kawakibi, openly declared that the Ottoman Empire should be both Turkish and Arab, with the latter exercising religious and cultural leadership.

Rise of modern Arab nationalism
In 1911, Arab intellectuals and politicians from throughout the Levant formed al-Fatat ("the Young Arab Society"), a small Arab nationalist club, in Paris. Its stated aim was "raising the level of the Arab nation to the level of modern nations." In the first few years of its existence, al-Fatat called for greater autonomy within a unified Ottoman state rather than Arab independence from the empire. Al-Fatat hosted the Arab Congress of 1913 in Paris, the purpose of which was to discuss desired reforms with other dissenting individuals from the Arab world. They also requested that Arab conscripts to the Ottoman army not be required to serve in non-Arab regions except in time of war. However, as the Ottoman authorities cracked down on the organization's activities and members, al-Fatat went underground and demanded the complete independence and unity of the Arab provinces.

Nationalist individuals became more prominent during the waning years of Ottoman authority, but the idea of Arab nationalism had virtually no impact on the majority of Arabs as they considered themselves loyal subjects of the Ottoman Empire. The British, for their part, incited the Sharif of Mecca to launch the Arab Revolt during the First World War. The Ottomans were defeated and the rebel forces, loyal to the Sharif's son Faysal ibn al-Husayn entered Damascus in 1918. By now, Faysal along with many Iraqi intellectuals and military officers had joined al-Fatat which would form the backbone of the newly created Arab state that consisted of much of the Levant and the Hejaz.

Damascus became the coordinating center of the Arab nationalist movement as it was seen as the birthplace of the ideology, the seat of Faysal—the first Arab "sovereign" after nearly 400 years of Turkish suzerainty—and because the nationalists of the entire Mashreq region were familiar with it. Nonetheless, Jerusalem, Beirut, and Baghdad remained significant bases of support. Following the creation of Faysal's state, a serious tension within the Arab nationalist movement became visible; the conflict between the ideology's highest ideal of forming a single independent unit comprising all countries that shared the Arabic language and heritage, and the tendency to give precedence to local ambitions.

To further tensions, a rift formed between the older nationalist members of various Syrian urban-class families and the generally younger nationalists who became close to Faysal—his Hejazi troops, Iraqi and Syrian military officers, and Palestinian and Syrian intellectuals. The older guard was mainly represented by Rida Pasha al-Rikabi, who served as Faysal's prime minister, while the younger guard did not have one particular leader. However, the youth within al-Fatat founded the Arab Independence Party ("al-Istiqlal") in February 1919. Its goal was to achieve unity and complete Arab independence. Prominent members included Izzat Darwaza and Shukri al-Quwatli. Centered in Damascus with branches in various cities throughout the Levant, al-Istiqlal received political and financial support from Faysal, but relied on the inner circle of al-Fatat to survive.

During the war, Britain had been a major sponsor of Arab nationalist thought and ideology, primarily as a weapon to use against the power of the Ottoman Empire. Although the Arab forces were promised a state that included much of the Arabian Peninsula and the Fertile Crescent the secret Sykes–Picot Agreement between Britain and France provided for the territorial division of much of that region between the two imperial powers. During the inter-war years and the British Mandate period, when Arab lands were under French and British control, Arab nationalism became an important anti-imperial opposition movement against European rule.

Growth of the movement

A number of Arab revolts against the European powers took place following the establishment of the British and French mandates. Resentment of British rule culminated in the Iraqi revolt of 1920. The uprising which was carried out by the urban population as well as the rural tribes of Iraq ended in 1921. The British drastically changed their policy in Iraq afterwards. Although the mandate was still in place officially, the British role was virtually reduced to an advisory one. In 1925, the Druze of southern Syria under the leadership of Sultan al-Atrash revolted against French rule. The revolt subsequently spread throughout Syria, particularly in Damascus where an uprising by the citizens took place. The French responded by systematically bombarding the city, resulting in thousands of deaths. The revolt was put down by the end of the year, but it is credited with forcing the French to take more steps to ensure Syrian independence. In Egypt, resentment of British hegemony led to wide-scale revolts across the country in 1919. As a result of three-year negotiations following the uprising, the British agreed to allow Egypt's official independence in 1922, but their military still held great influence in the country. The political leaders of the Egyptian revolution espoused Egyptian nationalism, rather than an Arab nationalist alternative.

The relative independence of Egypt, Iraq, Saudi Arabia and North Yemen encouraged Arab nationalists to put forward programs of action against colonial powers in the region. According to historian Youssef Choueiri, the "first public glimmerings" of a pan-Arab approach occurred in 1931, during the convention of a pan-Islamic conference in Jerusalem which highlighted Muslim fears of the increasing growth of Zionism in Palestine. Arab delegates held a separate conference and for the first time delegates from North Africa, Egypt, the Arabian Peninsula and the Fertile Crescent convened together to discuss Arab matters. A pan-Arabist covenant was proclaimed centering on three main articles:

The Arab countries form an integral and indivisible whole. Hence the Arab nation does not accept or recognize the divisions of whatever nature to which it has been subjected.
All efforts in every Arab country are to be directed towards the achievement of total independence within one single unity. Every endeavor which confines political activities to local or regional issues is to be fought against.
Since colonialism is, in all its forms and manifestations, incompatible with the dignity and paramount aims of the Arab nation, the Arab nation rejects it and will resist it with all the means at its disposal.

Plans for a near-future conference were made, but never came into play due to Faysal's death in 1933 (delegates chose Faysal of Iraq to be their patron and he agreed to provide moral and material support for the movement) and fierce British opposition. However, the Arab Independence Party was formed by Palestinian and Iraqi activists from al-Fatat as a direct result of the Jerusalem conference on 13 August 1932. Most of the AIP's activities were centered in the Palestinian political field, but the party also worked towards achieving Arab unity and solidarity as a means to strengthen Arab resistance against the British Mandate in Palestine and increased Jewish settlement occurring there. In August 1933, the League of Nationalist Action (LNA) was founded in Lebanon by Western-educated professional civil service groups with the aims of creating a common Arab market and industrial base as well as the abolishment of customs barriers between the Arab countries. By proposing agrarian reforms to limit the power of landowners, abolishing what they considered "feudalism" and promoting the growth of an industry, the LNA sought to undermine the absentee landlords in the Levant who tended to encourage local nationalism and were open to working with European authorities or Jewish land purchasers. The LNA enjoyed a level of popularity throughout the 1930s, but did not survive into the 1940s.

Following the killing of the Syrian Arab guerrilla leader Izz ad-Din al-Qassam by British forces in Ya'bad, Arab-Jewish tensions in Palestine reached a climax. Anti-Zionist sentiments reached a boiling point on 15 April 1936, when an armed group of Arabs killed a Jewish civilian after intercepting his car near the village of Bal'a. After Jews retaliated by killing two Arab farmers near Jaffa, this sparked an Arab revolt in Palestine. The AIP along with Palestinian notables selected popular leader and Grand Mufti of Jerusalem, Amin al-Husseini to lead the uprising. The Arab Higher Committee (AHC), a national committee bringing together Arab factions in Palestine, was established to coordinate the uprising. To protest increased Jewish immigration, a general strike was declared and a political, economic, and social boycott of Jews soon ensued.

The events in Palestine followed similar anti-colonial activities in Egypt and Syria which helped inspire the uprising. In Egypt, week-long anti-British demonstrations had eventually resulted in the restoration of the Egyptian constitution while in Syria, a general strike held in January–February 1936 led to major negotiations for an independence deal with the French government. The British took a firm stance against the nationalist revolt in Palestine, dissolving the AHC forcing al-Husayni into exile in Lebanon in 1937. Al-Husayni, who leaned more towards Palestinian nationalism, was instrumental in organizing the pan-Arab Bloudan Conference on 9 September 1937 in Syria which gathered 524 delegates from across the Arab world, although al-Husayni himself was not in attendance. According to author Adeeb Dawisha, although the uprising had been quelled by 1939, it greatly "contributed to the growth of Arab nationalist sentiment" and began the development of "solidarity" between Arab governments.

Meanwhile, a clandestine Arab nationalist society was formed in Iraq in 1938 which came to be known as Arab Nationalist Party (ANP). The ANP typically confined itself to influencing events and leaders in Iraq rather than taking the lead of a mass nationalist movement. King Ghazi of Iraq was one such leader. Ghazi intended to build a strong Iraqi army and actively sought to annex Kuwait. Many Arab nationalist politicians from Kuwait, who favored independence particularly after the discovery of oil there in 1938, were provided safe haven in Iraq after being repressed by the quasi-rulers of the sheikhdom, the al-Sabah family (Kuwait was still a British territory at the time.) Ghazi died in a car accident in 1939, prompting a number of his army officers to allege the king was assassinated by British forces. That same year, al-Husayni arrived in Baghdad after escaping from Lebanon, giving a morale boost to the pan-Arab dimension in Iraqi politics. The prime minister at the time, Nuri al-Said and the regent king 'Abd al-Ilah, did not harbor the pan-Arabist sympathies Ghazi espoused.

Rashid Ali al-Gaylani succeeded al-Said as Prime Minister in March 1940 and took a neutral position regarding World War II, opening dialogue with the German government which was at war with Britain. Under great pressure from the latter, al-Gaylani resigned on 31 January 1941 and al-Said took his place. The perceived British interjection in Iraq's internal affairs angered Arab nationalist officers in the army, leading a group of them to overthrow the government in April and install al-Gaylani as Prime Minister. To counter a British military response to the coup, al-Gaylani enlisted the support of Germany, but the German military did not arrive to aid the Arab nationalist government. With pro-German Vichy France having taken control of neighboring Syria, Britain reoccupied Iraq in May to prevent it from joining the Axis powers. By 1 June, al-Gaylani and al-Husayni fled to the country for Germany, while the army officers who carried out the coup were captured and executed.

Al-Husayni became increasingly acquainted with Adolf Hitler, the Nazi leader of Germany, and other Nazi officials and attempted to coordinate Nazi and Arab policies to solve what he believed was the "Jewish problem" in Palestine. In one of the mufti's speeches he asked Arabs to unite and "kill the Jews wherever you find them." Throughout World War II, the Nazi government, seeking to take advantage of widespread anti-imperialist feelings in the Middle East, had broadcast anti-Semitic messages tailored to Arabic-speaking Muslims in the Middle East via radio.

The conflict in Iraq provoked anger and frustration throughout the Arab world and the British acknowledged the rapid growth of Arab nationalist feeling among the Arab population, large segments of which saw the events in Iraq as a valiant struggle against imperialism. British Foreign Secretary, Anthony Eden, officially stated Britain's support of strong pan-Arab ties in a bid to ease anti-British sentiments in the region. The events of the region influenced the creation of the Arab Union Club in Egypt in 1942 which called for developing stronger ties between Egypt and the Arab world. Branches were subsequently opened in Baghdad, Beirut, Jaffa and Damascus, and Egyptian Prime Minister Mostafa El-Nahas adopted its platform, pledging to help protect "the interests and rights" of the "sister Arab nations" and explore the "question of Arab unity."

Establishment of the Arab League
Rivalry for the leadership of the Arab world developed mostly between the political establishments of Iraq and Egypt in the period following the failure of Rashid Ali coup. Eden's stated support for increased Arab ties encouraged Nuri al-Said of Iraq to propose his own plan for Arab unity in January 1943, dubbed the "Fertile Crescent Union." The plan recognized the linguistic, cultural and economic ties between the states of the Fertile Crescent region as well as the differences between their inhabitants. It sought to unify those states in a stage-based process whereby the initial stage would see Syria, Transjordan, Palestine and Lebanon unite with limited autonomy given to the Jews in Palestine and special rights for the Christians in Lebanon. Afterward the Levantine state and Iraq would form an "Arab League," to which other Arab states could join, that would oversee matters of defense, foreign policy, customs, currency and the safeguarding of minorities. The proposal reflected a combination of factors, namely the expansionist ambitions of the Hashemites, the attempt by Iraq's political establishment to secure the mantle of Arab leadership in their rivalry with Egypt and a genuine embrace of Arab identity by Iraq's leaders.

The Egyptian government of Nahas Pasha launched a rival initiative for establishing closer inter-Arab relations, and sent delegations to several Arab states. Influential Arab nationalist figures in the country sought to emphasize Egypt's Arab character, the most of prominent of them, Abdul Rahman al-Azzam, even writing "Egypt was an Arab country before Christ." The apparent Egyptian embrace of Arabism was met with general Arab excitement at the popular level and Pasha's efforts gained more traction among the various Arab governments than al-Said's Fertile Crescent proposal. Reasons for this ranged from the antipathy of the Saudi royal family and the Damascus political establishment to the leadership ambitions of the rival Hashemite family to the belief by Lebanon's Maronite Christian community that Egypt's plan would not require conceding future independence. Between 25 September-8 October 1944, the leaders of Iraq, Syria, Saudi Arabia, Lebanon, Transjordan, Yemen and the Palestinian Arab community convened in Alexandria, Egypt in a meeting hosted by the Egyptian government which ended with an agreement known as the "Alexandria Protocol."

Peak under Egyptian leadership

After the Second World War, Gamal Abdel Nasser, the leader of Egypt, was a significant player in the rise of Arab nationalism. Opposed to the British control of the Suez Canal Zone and concerned at Egypt becoming a Cold War battleground Nasser pushed for a collective Arab security pact within the framework of the Arab League. A key aspect of this was the need for economic aid that was not dependent on peace with Israel and the establishment of U.S. or British military bases within Arab countries. Nasser nationalized the Suez Canal and directly challenged the dominance of the Western powers in the region. At the same time he opened Egypt up as a Cold War zone by receiving aid and arms shipments from the Soviet bloc countries that were not dependent on treaties, bases and peace accords. However, because of the connotations for Cold War dominance of the region, Egypt also received aid from the US, who sought to promote the emerging Arab nationalism as a barrier to communism.

The question of Palestine and opposition to Zionism became a rallying point for Arab nationalism from both a religious perspective and a military perspective. The fact that the Zionists were Jewish promoted a religious flavor to the xenophobic rhetoric and strengthened Islam as a defining feature of Arab nationalism. The humiliating defeat in the 1948 Arab–Israeli War strengthened the Arabs' resolve to unite in favor of a pan-Arab nationalist ideal. With the advent of Palestinian nationalism, a debate circled between those who believed that pan-Arab unity would bring about destruction of Israel (the view advocated by the Arab Nationalist Movement) or whether the destruction of Israel would bring about pan-Arab unity (the view advocated by Fatah).

Pan-Arabism was initially a secular movement. Arab nationalists generally rejected religion as a main element in political identity, and promoted the unity of Arabs regardless of sectarian identity. However, the fact that most Arabs were Muslims was used by some as an important building block in creating a new Arab national identity. An example of this was Michel Aflaq, founder along with Salah al-Din al-Bitar and Zaki al-Arsuzi of the Ba'ath Party in Syria in the 1940s. Aflaq, though himself a Christian, viewed Islam as a testament to the "Arab genius", and once said "Muhammed was the epitome of all the Arabs. So let all the Arabs today be Muhammed." Since the Arabs had reached their greatest glories through the expansion of Islam, Islam was seen as a universal message as well as an expression of secular genius on the part of the Arab peoples. Islam had given the Arabs a "glorious past", which was very different from the "shameful present". In effect, the troubles of the Arab presence were because the Arabs had diverged from their "eternal and perfect symbol", Islam. The Arabs needed to have a "resurrection" (ba'ath in Arabic). After the Ba'athist military coups in Iraq and Syria in the 1960s, the Ba'athists "contributed very little to the development of all-Arab nationalism, which was its original raison d'etre."

Meanwhile, King Faisal of Saudi Arabia sought to counter the influences of Arab nationalism and communism in the region by promoting pan-Islamism as an alternative. He called for the establishment of the Muslim World League, visiting several Muslim countries to advocate the idea. He also engaged in a propaganda and media war with Nasser.

Decline
After the defeat of the Arab coalition by Israel during the 1967 Six-Day War—which the reigning Arab nationalist leader Nasser had dubbed al-Ma‘raka al-Masiriya, (the battle of destiny)—the Arab nationalist movement is said to have suffered an "irreversible" slide towards "political marginality".

From the mid-1960s onward, the movement was further weakened by factional splits and ideological infighting. The formerly pro-Nasser Arab Nationalist Movement, publicly abandoned Nasserism in favor of Marxism–Leninism and fell apart soon after. In 1966, the Arab Socialist Ba'ath Party split into rival factions based in Baghdad and Damascus, respectively.

Reasons for decline
Factors credited with weakening the movement include:
the elimination of many of the irritants that stoked nationalist passion as imperialism and pro-Westernism waned in the Arab world during the 1950s and early 1960s; 
The historian Adeed Dawisha said:
The British presence in Egypt and Iraq had been eliminated; the Baghdad Pact had been defeated; Jordan's British chief of staff, Sir John Bagot Glubb, had been dismissed; Lebanon's pro-Western president, Camille Chamoun, had been replaced by the independent Fu'ad Shihab; and the Algerians, sacrificing a million dead in a heroic struggle, had triumphed over French colonial power.
regional attachments such as Iraqi president Abd al-Karim Qasim's "Iraq first" policy;
attachments to tribes and "deeply-ingrained tribal values";
suspicion of Arab unity by minority groups such as Kurds in Iraq who were non-Arab, or Shia Arabs in Iraq who feared Arab nationalism was actually "a Sunni project" to establish "Sunni hegemony"; 
the Islamic revival, which grew as Arab nationalism declined, and whose Islamist adherents were very hostile towards nationalism in general, believing it had no place in Islam;
lack of interest by the movement in pluralism, separation of powers, freedom of political expression and other democratic concepts which might have "resuscitated" the ideology in its moment of weakness.

Attempts at unity

In the 1940s, rulers such as Abdullah I of Jordan and Nuri al-Said of Iraq sought to create an expanded Arab empire constructed out of the smaller nation-states that had been created in the mandate period. Abdullah's dream was to be king of a Greater Syria while as-Said's dream was for a Fertile Crescent Federation. These aspirations, however, were unpopular and met with suspicion in the countries they sought to conquer. The creation of the Arab League and its insistence on the territorial integrity and respect for sovereignty of each member state, the assassination of Abdullah, and the 14 July Revolution weakened the political feasibility of these ideas.

During much of the 20th century, the rivalry between Syria and Nasser in Egypt for who would lead the union undermined the effort of forming a united Arab state. In 1958, Egypt and Syria temporarily joined to create the United Arab Republic. It was accompanied by attempts to include Iraq and North Yemen in the union. This very exercise, while fostering Egypt's position at the centre of Arab politics, led to the weakening of Syria.

With the 14 July Revolution taking place in Iraq the same year, Western powers feared the fallouts of a powerful Arab nationalism in the region. Foreign powers were not only concerned about the possible spread of such revolutionary movements in other Arab states, but also worried about losing the control and monopoly over the region's natural oil resources. However, due to discontent over the hegemony of Egypt and after a coup in Syria that introduced a more radical government to power, the United Arab Republic collapsed in 1961. The term United Arab Republic continued to be used in Egypt until 1971, after the death of Nasser.

Another unsuccessful attempt at union occurred in 1963. That year the Arab nationalist Ba'ath Party came to power in Syria and Iraq and talks were held on uniting the two countries with Egypt. On 17 April an agreement to unite the countries was signed, but Ba'ath leaders complained of what they considered Egyptian president Nasser's "patronizing, bullying tone" and his insistence on a single centralized party structure under his leadership. In Syria, pro-Nasserists were purged from the Syrian military and cabinet. In response, large pro-Nasser riots erupted in Damascus and Aleppo but were crushed with 50 rioters killed. A pro-Nasser coup attempt on 18 July 1963 in Syria also ended unsuccessfully. Hundreds of people killed or wounded in an attempt to take over the Damascus radio station and army headquarters, and 27 rebel officers were summarily executed. Nasser then formally withdrew from the union agreement, denouncing the Syrian Ba'athists as "fascists and murderers".

In 1964, Egypt, Iraq and North Yemen formed a Unified Political Command in order to prepare the gradual merger in a new United Arab Republic, however, both projects failed in 1966 and 1967. In 1971 and 1972 Muammar Gaddafi attempted to unite Libya, Egypt, Sudan and Syria to form the Federation of Arab Republics. This loose union lasted until 1977 when it split due to political and territorial disputes between the republics' leadership. In 1974, Muammar Gaddafi and Habib Bourguiba attempted their two nations of Libya and Tunisia to form the Arab Islamic Republic. The plan was rejected by Bourgiba due to his realization of unity of the Maghreb states. This would later become the Arab Maghreb Union.

In October 1978, Iraqi President Ahmed Hassan al-Bakr began working closely with Syrian President Hafez al-Assad to foil the Camp David Accords. They signed a charter in Baghdad for Joint National Action which provided for the "closest form of unity ties" including "complete military unity" as well as "economic, political and cultural unification". An agreement to unify the two states was to come into effect in July 1979. However, Iraqi Vice President Saddam Hussein was fearful of losing his power to Assad (who was supposed to become the deputy leader in the new union) and forced al-Bakr into retirement under threat of violence. Although unity talks did continue between Assad and Saddam after July 1979, but Assad rejected Iraqi demands for a full merger between the two states and for the immediate deployment of Iraqi troops into Syria. Instead Assad, perhaps fearful of Iraqi domination and a new war with Israel, advocated a step-by-step approach. The unity talks were eventually suspended indefinitely after an alleged discovery of a Syrian plot to overthrow Saddam Hussein in November 1979.

Notable Arab nationalists

Michel Aflaq
George Antonius
Zaki al-Arsuzi
Jurji Zaydan
Samih al-Qasim
Izzat Darwaza
George Habash
Jaafar Nimeiry (President of Sudan) 
Sati' al-Husri
Adnan Pachachi
Abd al-Rahman al-Kawakibi
Ameen Rihani
Hamdeen Sabahi
Constantin Zureiq
Hussein bin Ali (Sharif of Mecca)
Yasser Arafat (President of the State of Palestine)
Hafez al-Assad (President of Syria)
Ahmed Hassan al-Bakr (President of Iraq)
Ahmed Ben Bella (President of Algeria)
Salah al-Din al-Bitar (Prime Minister of Syria)
Faisal I (King of Iraq)
Muammar Gaddafi (Leader of Libya)
Saddam Hussein (President of Iraq)
Gamal Abdel Nasser (President of Egypt/UAR)
Shukri al-Quwatli (President of Syria)
Kamal Jumblatt
Amin Al-Husseini (Grand Mufti of Jerusalem)
Salah Jadid (President of Syria)

See also

Arab socialism
Iraqi nationalism
Jordanian nationalism
Lebanese nationalism
Libyan nationalism
Nasserism
Palestinian nationalism
Syrian nationalism
Tunisian nationalism

References

Bibliography
Abu-'Uksa, Wael (2016). Freedom in the Arab World: Concepts and Ideologies in Arabic Thought in the Nineteenth Century. Cambridge University Press.

Hiro, Dilip.  "Arab nationalism." Dictionary of the Middle East. New York: St. Martin's Press, 1996. pp. 24–25.

Karsh, Efraim.  Arafat's War: The Man and His Battle for Israeli Conquest.  New York: Grove Press, 2003.
Karsh, Efraim. Islamic Imperialism: A History.  New Haven: Yale University Press, 2006.
Sela, Avraham.  "Arab Nationalism."  The Continuum Political Encyclopedia of the Middle East. Ed. Sela. New York: Continuum, 2002.  pp. 151–155

External links
"Islamic critique of Arab Nationalism" by Muhammad Yahya, Al-Tawhid, Vol III, No. 2, 1986.
"Arab Nationalism: Mistaken Identity" by Martin Kramer, Daedalus, Summer 1993, pp. 171–206.
"Requiem for Arab Nationalism" by Adeed Dawisha, Middle East Quarterly, Winter 2003, pp. 25–41.
"The Rise of Arab Nationalism in the Sudan" by Mohamed Hassan Fadlalla, Codex Online S.A.

 
Arab League